Vanessa García Vega (born July 18, 1984 in Vega Baja, Puerto Rico) is an Olympic and National Record holding freestyle swimmer from Puerto Rico. She swam for her native country at the 2004, 2008, 2012, and 2016 Olympics.

García's silver medal in the 50 freestyle, and bronze in the 100 at the 2007 Pan American Games were Puerto Rico's only swimming medals at the Games.

She additionally has four gold medals from the Central American and Caribbean Games, having one gold in the 50 and 100 free in both 2006 and 2010. She holds the Central American and Caribbean Games record in the 50 freestyle, set at the 2010 games in Mayahuez, Puerto Rico.

At the 2006 Central American and Caribbean Games, García set the Games Records in winning the 50 and 100 frees.

References

External links

1984 births
Living people
Puerto Rican female freestyle swimmers
Puerto Rican female swimmers
People from Vega Baja, Puerto Rico
Swimmers at the 2004 Summer Olympics
Swimmers at the 2008 Summer Olympics
Swimmers at the 2012 Summer Olympics
Swimmers at the 2016 Summer Olympics
Olympic swimmers of Puerto Rico
Swimmers at the 2007 Pan American Games
Swimmers at the 2011 Pan American Games
Swimmers at the 2015 Pan American Games
Pan American Games silver medalists for Puerto Rico
Pan American Games bronze medalists for Puerto Rico
Pan American Games medalists in swimming
Central American and Caribbean Games gold medalists for Puerto Rico
Competitors at the 2006 Central American and Caribbean Games
Competitors at the 2010 Central American and Caribbean Games
Central American and Caribbean Games medalists in swimming
Medalists at the 2007 Pan American Games
20th-century Puerto Rican women
21st-century Puerto Rican women